ISO 2014 is an international standard that was issued in April 1976, and superseded by ISO 8601 in June 1988. ISO 2014 was the standard that originally introduced the all-numeric date notation [YYYY]-[MM]-[DD] with the digits in order starting with the most significant digit first (similar to big-endian). It was technically identical to ISO Recommendation R 2014 from 1971.

References

02014